Joburg Ballet is a ballet dance company based within the Joburg Theatre, Johannesburg, South Africa. Joburg Ballet was formerly known as the South African Ballet Theatre (SABT).  The company was formed in 2001 by six dancers who were retrenched by  PACT Ballet. The company has been invited to perform in Russia in 2006 and has had exchange programmes with the Royal Swedish Ballet, the Royal Danish Ballet, the National Ballet of Canada, the Paris Opera and the San Francisco Ballet.

About Joburg Ballet
Joburg Ballet is a full-time, professional ballet company, resident at Joburg Theatre in the heart of Johannesburg. Its repertoire includes full-length productions of major classical works, as well as shorter ballets, including original works created for the company by South African and international choreographers. The company presents three major seasons a year at Joburg Theatre, and also tours to other regions in South Africa and internationally. The company provides a high standard of training for students via Joburg Ballet School and Academy, plus a comprehensive programme of community-based development and outreach work via its Satellite Schools, with emphasis on historically disadvantaged communities.

Joburg Ballet is committed to openness, wide-reaching engagement, accessibility and inclusivity, and to sharing its energy and creativity with audiences, dance teachers and arts practitioners in Johannesburg, South Africa and abroad. It is dedicated to the growth and revitalisation of the great legacy of classical ballet and to the development of new choreographers, new works and new audiences from across South Africa. The company’s Chief Executive Officer is Esther Nasser and the Artistic Director is Iain MacDonald. The company's Ballet Mistress is Lauren Slade

Joburg Ballet is supported by the Friends of the Ballet. 

The company is made up of the following ranks: Principals, Senior Soloists, Soloists, Senior Corps de Ballet, Corps de Ballet, Junior Corps de Ballet and Aspirants.

Board and Joburg Ballet Trust 

As of January 2023, details of the Joburg Ballet Board and the South African Ballet Theatre Trust (SABTT) are as follows:

Honorary Life Patron: Annzie Hancock

Patron: Tito Mboweni

Board of Directors: Melanie de Nysschen (Chair), Lulu Letlape, Iain MacDonald (Artistic Director), Nkopane Maphiri, 
Adv. Jean Meiring, Lufuno Muthubi, Esther Nasser (CEO), Mr. Mavuso Shabalala
 Retrieved 14 January 2023.

Trust: Alastair Campbell, Chet Diepraam, Mbali Dlamini, Biddy Faber, Annzie Hancock (Chair), Iain MacDonald, Jenni Newman

Repertoire

2015

 Swan Lake
  Don Quixote

2016

 Giselle
  Romeo and Juliet
 Cinderella

2017

 La Traviata - The Ballet
 Big City, Big Dreams, in collaboration with Vuyani Dance Theatre and Moving Into Dance Mophatong
 Snow White – The Ballet

2018

 Carmen, choreographed by Veronica Paeper and performed to a live orchestral accompaniment by the Johannesburg Philharmonic Orchestra
 Fire & Ice
 The Nutcracker
 Cinderella

Support for the Company
Joburg Ballet is a registered charity so is able to receive financial support. Sponsorship is crucial for the company to continue developing and taking its work to the widest possible audience. There are many ways for members of the public to help, from sponsoring a production to paying for a dancer’s pointe shoes, or assisting aspiring young dancers pay their tuition fees.

References

External links

 Official site of the Joburg Ballet
 Official site of the Friends of the Ballet

Ballet companies
Culture_of_Johannesburg